Philip H. Greene Jr. is a retired United States Navy rear admiral. He graduated from the United States Merchant Marine Academy in 1978. After retirement, RADM Greene served as the 11th Superintendent of the Academy from 2010-2011.  The Rear Admiral’s advanced degrees include an MS in national security strategy from the Naval War College (’94) and an MS in information systems from the Naval Post Graduate School (’85).

References

Living people
United States Merchant Marine Academy superintendents
United States Navy rear admirals (upper half)
United States Merchant Marine Academy alumni
Naval Postgraduate School alumni
Naval War College alumni
Year of birth missing (living people)